Abbott House may refer to:

Places
(by state then city)
Robert S. Abbott House, Chicago, Illinois, listed on the National Register of Historic Places (NRHP)
Abbott–Holloway Farm, Bethlehem, Indiana, NRHP-listed
Jacob Abbott House, Farmington, Maine, NRHP-listed in Franklin County
Abbott Graves House, Kennebunkport, Maine, NRHP-listed in York County
Ezra Abbott House, Owatonna, Minnesota, NRHP-listed in Steele County, Minnesota
John Abbott II House, Trenton, New Jersey, NRHP-listed in Mercer County
Abbott–Decou House, Trenton, New Jersey, NRHP-listed in Mercer County
Abbott House (childcare agency), an orphanage in Irvington, New York
William Riley Abbott House, South Mills, North Carolina, NRHP-listed
Abbott–Page House, Milan, Ohio, NRHP-listed
John Abbott House, Abbottstown, Pennsylvania, NRHP-listed

See also
George S. Abbott Building, Waterbury, Connecticut, NRHP-listed
Abbot House (disambiguation)